Scytodes lugubris is a species of spitting spider in the family Scytodidae. It is found in Tropical Asia, has been introduced into Hawaii, and Mexico.

References

Scytodidae
Articles created by Qbugbot
Spiders described in 1887